Prairie Fire may refer to:

Arts, entertainment, and media
 Prairie Fire (magazine), a Canadian literary magazine
 Prairie Fire (TV program), a news magazine/documentary program, University of Illinois at Urbana-Champaign, Illinois, United States
 Prairie Fire: The Politics of Revolutionary Anti-Imperialism, a manifesto by the American radical group Weather Underground
 Prairie Fire Organizing Committee, an American anti-capitalist activist group
 A 1955 painting by Blackbear Bosin
 S.O.G. Prairie Fire, downloadable content in the video game ARMA 3
 a 1977 film by John Hanson and Rob Nilsson

Other uses
 Operation Prairie Fire, a 1968 US Studies and Observations Group (SOG) reconnaissance mission into Laos as part of Operation Dewey Canyon
 Operation Prairie Fire, US military strikes against Libya in 1986
 Prairie Fire (ringette team), a team in Canada's National Ringette League
 Saskatchewan Prairie Fire, of the Rugby Canada Super League
 Wildfire, in grassland
 Knox College (Illinois), Galesburg, Illinois
 Castilleja, a genus of plants

See also
Museum at Prairiefire, Overland Park, Kansas
Prairie Fires:The American Dreams of Laura Ingalls Wilder, a literary biography.